HyperVM was a multi-tiered, multi-server, multi-virtualization software product allowing a Virtual private server (VPS) vendor to provision, manage and delegate Xen- or OpenVZ-based virtual private servers. HyperVM also comes integrated with Kloxo hosting control panel which means that, using HyperVM, the provider can deploy a full-fledged web hosting system out-of-the-box. HyperVM also allows users to manage VPS' across multiple servers transparently: it provides a mechanism to manage their networking configuration (IP address, gateway) from the control panel itself, and has a full-fledged IP address pool to facilitate large scale management.

HyperVM is tightly integrated with Kloxo, and all Kloxo functions can be accessed from HyperVM without needing to log into Kloxo.

History

On July 10, 2009, Kloxo and HyperVM was announced as open source software. Since then, it has been extensively upgraded. Some of the notable features of Hypervm now include: 
 Integration with WHMCS and AWB
 Cross Datacenter Deployment
 Distributed management via single console
 Hierarchical client system.
 Web-based graphic user interface
 OpenVZ and Xen virtualization support
 Windows Virtualization via Xen
 Intelligent IP handling
 Traffic Shaping and Network management
 A Built in messaging system
bug hypervmbug

See also

 Kernel-based Virtual Machine

References

Virtualization software